is a railway station located in Kagoshima, Kagoshima, Japan. The station opened in 1934.

Lines 
Kyushu Railway Company
Ibusuki Makurazaki Line

JR

Adjacent stations

History
In the next phase of expansion, the track was extended south, with Kiire opening as the new southern terminus on 20 May 1934. On 31 October 1963, the line which served the station was renamed the Ibusuki Makurazaki Line. With the privatization of Japanese National Railways (JNR), the successor of JGR, on 1 April 1987, the station came under the control of JR Kyushu.

Nearby places
Kagoshima City Office Kiire Branch
Kiire Post office
Kagoshima City Kiire Elementary School
Kagoshima City Kiire Junior High School

References

Railway stations in Kagoshima Prefecture
Railway stations in Japan opened in 1934